Natalia Potkina (born March 14, 1982, Minsk, Republic of Belarus) is a Belarusian fashion designer, the head of «Natasha Potkina’s Fashion House», the creator of Natasha Potkina's brand of designer clothes. She is also the winner and Laureate of the Belarusian and international festivals and contests of fashion: «White Amphora», «Fashion Mill», «Admiralty Needle», «Jeans-Russia» and others.

Biography 
Natasha created her first collection of clothes, under the name «Birdies of Paradise», when she was a student of the 10th form; the collection was shown to her schoolmates at the graduation party. In 2001, she participated at the festival of vanguard fashion designers, «Mamont», where she won a special prize of jury. The same year, at the International contest of fashion designers «White Amphora» in Vitebsk, her collection «Safari Maiden Voyage» won the first award in the nomination «Tatiana Day». From the first collection created by Natasha Potkina, «Safari», one of models was purchased by the singer Natalia Podolskaya. In this outfit Podolskaya, for the first time, performed at the Belarusian song contest, «At Intersections of Europe».

In 2003, she graduated from the Minsk Institute of Modern Knowledge named after A.M. Shirokov (her specialty being a design and garment construction).

In 2009, Natasha Potkina arranged a display of her collection «Gravitation» at the National Academic Opera and Ballet Theater in Minsk. This event created a furor since before, in Minsk, there were no such large-scale fashionable actions yet.

In 2012, Natasha Potkina opened the designing agency. Now her company is engaged in creating garment creations and designs for factories of Belarus and the CIS countries.

In April, 2016, together with partners from Turkey, Natasha Potkina opened drapery, skin, furs and accessories store, under the name «House of Fashion Textiles».

In October, 2016, Natasha opened a school of cut and sewing where together with Karatova Oksana Nikolaevna (the teacher of designing, the author of the book «Designing and Modelling of Clothes») she gives lessons to persons eager to learn the skill of creating clothes.

The famous Belarusian designer Natasha Potkina is often called the most feminine fashionable designer of Belarus. Among her clients we find Natalia Podolskaya, Angelica Agurbash, Polina Smolova, Vera Karetnikova, Gyunesh, Hera, Iskui Abalyan and many others. Natasha helps with the creation of images for participants of national selections of both children's and adult's «Eurovision».

Contests and awards 
 Winner of the festival of vanguard art «Mammoth 2001», Minsk;
 Winner of the 1st award of the contest of fashion designers «White amphora 2001», Vitebsk;
 Winner of the fashion festival «Mill of Fashion 2002», Minsk,
 Finalist of the contest of fashion designers «The Admiralty Needle 2002», Saint-Petersburg
 Winner of the 3rd awards of the art festival «Three Moon - 2003», Minsk;
 Winner of the All-Russian contest «Jeans-Russia 2004», 2nd place, Moscow;
 The participant of a fashion show of the Belarusian designers in the Russian House, Berlin;
 Participant in opening the exhibition of objects of art, «March Cats 2005», in Palace of Arts, Minsk;
 Winner of a fashion festival «Mill of Fashion 2005», Minsk;
 Finalist of fashion festival «Assembly of Fashion», Mosow;
 Participant in opening the exhibition of objects of art «March cats 2006», Palace of Arts, Minsk;
 Winner of the «Belarus Press Photo 2010» project in the nomination «Fashion photo»;
 Participant of Belarus Fashion Week

Collections 

 2001 «Topsy turvy» and «Electro-cutter of Knots», winner of the festival of vanguard art «Mammoth 2001», Minsk
 2001 «Safari first class», winner of the first place in the contest of fashion designers «White Amphora», Vitebsk
 2002 «Interval of Indifference», winner of the fashion festival «Mill of Fashion 2002», Minsk, finalist of the contest of fashion designers, «Admiralty Needle 2002», Saint-Petersburg
 2003 «El Caprichcho», diploma collection, winner of the 3rd place at the festival of art «Three Moon», Minsk
 2004 «Damn it!». Winner of the All-Russian contest «Jeans-Russia 2004", the 2nd place Moscow; Winner of the fashion festival «Mill of Fashion of 2004», Minsk; Participant of the fashion show of the Belarusian designers in the Russian House, Berlin; Participant in opening the  exhibition of objects of art «March Cats 2005»,  Palace of Arts, Minsk
 2005 «Trunk», Winner of the fashion festival «Mill of Fashion 2005”, Minsk; Finalist of the fashion festival «Assembly of Fashion», Moscow; Participant in opening the exhibition of objects of art, «March Cats 2006», in Palace of Arts, Minsk
 2006 «Wasabi», the collection presentation during a Fashion week in Minsk in the Belarusian Center of Fashion, November 17, 2006
 2009 «Gravitation», the collection presentation at National Academic Opera and Ballet Theater, March 19, 2009; the collection presentation in «Titan club”, November 27, 2009; advertising photographing of the collections became the winner of the project «Belarus Press Photo 2010», in the nomination Fashion photo.

Family 
Natalia Potkina was born in a family of builders. Natalia's father, Potkin Valery Aleksandrovich, is a well known construction figure in Belarus, the honourable builder of Belarus, the restorer, the Minsk Resident of the Year (2008), the creator and the director of the company «Elvira».

Natasha Potkina's children, her son Lev and the daughter Evelina, are winners of the international contest «Little Miss Universe» and «Little Mr. of the World» in Turkey («Little Miss of the Universe World 2014» & «Little Mister of the World 2014»).

References

1982 births
Belarusian businesspeople in fashion
Businesspeople from Minsk
Living people